Tanystoma is a genus of beetles in the family Carabidae. They are native to the Pacific Coast of North America from Oregon to Baja California.

Species include:

Species
These five species belong to the genus Tanystoma:
 Tanystoma cuyama Liebherr, 1985 
 Tanystoma diabolicum Liebherr, 1989 
 Tanystoma maculicolle (Dejean, 1828) (tule beetle)
 Tanystoma striatum (Dejean, 1828) 
 Tanystoma sulcatum (Dejean, 1828)

References

Platyninae
Insects of Mexico
Insects of the United States
Fauna of the California chaparral and woodlands